Jack Iyerak Anawak (born September 26, 1950) is a Canadian politician. He represented the electoral district of Nunatsiaq in the House of Commons of Canada from 1988 to 1997. He sat in the house as a member of the Liberal Party of Canada. Following his retirement from federal politics, he also served a term in the Legislative Assembly of Nunavut after that territory was created in 1999. He ran as the New Democratic Party's candidate for his old riding, now renamed Nunavut, in the 2015 election, but was defeated by Liberal candidate Hunter Tootoo.

Political career

Federal politics
Anawak was first elected in the 1988 election, and served as the Liberal Party's opposition critic for Northern Affairs in the 34th Canadian Parliament. Re-elected in the 1993 election, which was won by the Liberals, he was named parliamentary secretary to the Minister of Indian Affairs and Northern Development in the government of Jean Chrétien.

Territorial politics
In 1999 he was elected as a member of the Legislative Assembly of Nunavut for the seat of Rankin Inlet North. He was widely favoured to be the new territory's first Premier. However, he was perceived as the choice of the Chrétien government. The Assembly, which operates on a nonpartisan consensus model, selected Paul Okalik instead.

Anawak did not run for re-election in 2004. He tried to return to the Assembly in the 2008 Nunavut general election, filing nomination papers to run in the electoral district of Akulliq.   Elections Nunavut Chief Electoral Officer Sandy Kusugak rejected his candidacy, as he was not a full-time resident of Nunavut at the time his nomination papers were filed. Anawak took Elections Nunavut to court and managed to halt the election in that district pending his appeal, but on November 6, the Nunavut Court of Justice threw out the election challenge.

Anawak ran again in the 2013 territorial election, but finished fourth in the Iqaluit-Niaqunnguu riding.

Return to federal politics
In 2015, Anawak announced his intent to take back his old riding, now renamed Nunavut, in the 2015 election.  This time, he ran as the candidate of the New Democratic Party.  He came second in the race.

Popular culture
When the Canadian two-dollar coin was introduced, a number of nicknames were suggested. Jack Anawak proposed the name "Nanuq" [nanook, polar bear] in honour of Canadian Inuit and their northern culture; however, this culturally meaningful proposal went largely unnoticed beside the simple, mass-appeal "Twonie/Toonie".

Canadian Ambassador for Circumpolar Affairs

Anawak served as Canadian Ambassador for Circumpolar Affairs from January 2004 until 2006 when the position was discontinued by the Harper government.  Its functions were transferred to the bureaucratic level.

Electoral history

References

External links

Jack Iyerak Anawak on Two-Dollar Coin - Hansard April 26th, 1996
Inuktitut Living Dictionary 

Members of the House of Commons of Canada from the Northwest Territories
Liberal Party of Canada MPs
Inuit politicians
Members of the Legislative Assembly of Nunavut
21st-century Canadian politicians
1950 births
Living people
Inuit from the Northwest Territories
People from Rankin Inlet
Indigenous Members of the House of Commons of Canada
New Democratic Party candidates for the Canadian House of Commons
Inuit from Nunavut